Dru Katrina Sjodin (September 26, 1981 –  November 22, 2003) was an American woman who was abducted from the Columbia Mall parking lot in Grand Forks, North Dakota, by Alfonso Rodriguez Jr., on November 22, 2003. Her disappearance and murder garnered great media coverage throughout the United States and prompted the creation of the Dru Sjodin National Sex Offender Public Registry.

Murder 
At 4:00 p.m. on Saturday, November 22, 2003, Sjodin, a 22-year-old college student at the University of North Dakota and Gamma Phi Beta sorority member, finished her shift at the Victoria's Secret store located in the Columbia Mall in Grand Forks, North Dakota. After shopping for and purchasing a new purse from Marshall Field's, Sjodin left the mall and began walking to her 1994 Oldsmobile Cutlass. During this time, Sjodin was speaking with her boyfriend, Chris Lang, on her cell phone. Four minutes into their conversation, Lang reports Sjodin was saying "Okay, okay," before the call abruptly ended. Lang suspected that the call was just dropped and because Sjodin didn't give any sense of urgency, Lang thought nothing of it. About three hours later, Lang received another call from her cell phone, but heard only static and the sound of buttons being pressed. It was reported by authorities this second phone call originated somewhere near Fisher, Minnesota, but that has remained unsubstantiated. With this second call and Sjodin not showing up at her other job at the El Roco nightclub, there was concern for her whereabouts.
A week later, on December 1, a suspect, 50-year-old registered level-3 sex offender Alfonso Rodriguez Jr. (born February 18, 1953), was arrested in connection with Sjodin's disappearance.

Perpetrator

Alfonso Rodriguez Jr. was the son of migrant farm workers Dolores and Alfonso Rodriguez Sr., who traveled between Crystal City, Texas, and Minnesota and then decided to settle in 1963 in Crookston, Minnesota. He admitted to using many drugs during his youth and committed his first sexual assault with a knife when he was 21 by attempting to rape a woman he asked to give him a ride home.

Rodriguez had been released from prison May 1, 2003, after serving a 23-year prison term for rape, aggravated assault and kidnapping a woman. Rodriguez had also previously pleaded guilty to rape and was convicted multiple times for rape. He had a long criminal record that included repeated sexual assaults against women. He was released as a Minnesota Level 3 sex offender which meant he was highly likely to reoffend.

Police investigation
According to police reports, Rodriguez admitted being near the Columbia Mall the night Sjodin disappeared, allegedly viewing the film Once Upon a Time in Mexico at the Columbia Mall Cinema 4. However, that movie was not playing at that cinema or any other theater in the area. The police also found receipts of purchases that Rodriguez had made at several stores near the mall including one receipt for a knife which he had purchased at a nearby Menards store. Rodriguez apparently had two tool kit knives that could be purchased at only a particular home center store which was about one mile from the mall, but they were not purchased the day Sjodin disappeared and a purchase date for the knives was never established. Police found a tool kit knife in Rodriguez's car that was soaking in some type of cleaning solution inside a rear wheel well. Police also found a woman's shoe and a knife in the car that had blood on it that matched Sjodin's DNA.

Sjodin's body was recovered on April 17, 2004, just west of Crookston, Minnesota, when deep snow drifts began to melt. Crookston is also where Rodriguez lived with his mother. Sjodin's body was found partially nude and face down in a ravine. Her hands were tied behind her back and she had been beaten, stabbed, sexually assaulted, and had several lacerations including a five-and-a-half inch cut on her neck. A rope was also tied around her neck and remnants of a shopping bag were found under the rope, suggesting that a bag had been placed on her head. The medical examiner concluded that she had either died as a result of the major neck wound, from suffocation, or from exposure to the elements. Thousands of people had helped search for Sjodin, and hundreds attended her funeral.

Trial and sentencing
Because Sjodin had been taken across state lines, the crime became a federal case under the Federal Kidnapping Act. This meant that Rodriguez was eligible to receive the death penalty if convicted, a possibility not allowed under North Dakota or Minnesota law, as neither states have the death penalty. It was the first death penalty case in a century to take place in North Dakota. U.S. Attorney Drew Wrigley and Assistant U.S. Attorneys Keith Reisenauer and Norman Anderson prosecuted the case against Rodriguez. On August 30, 2006, Rodriguez was convicted in federal court of kidnapping resulting in death for the murder of Dru Sjodin, and on September 22, 2006, the jury recommended that he receive the death penalty. On February 8, 2007, Rodriguez was formally sentenced to death by U.S District Judge Ralph R. Erickson.  He is imprisoned at United States Penitentiary, Terre Haute, Terre Haute, Indiana. Judge Erickson arranged that Rodriguez would be executed in South Dakota.

Rodriguez later admitted his guilt in a death row interview with Dr. Michael Welner on June 28, 2013.  In October 2011, defense attorneys filed a federal habeas corpus motion claiming that Rodriguez is mentally disabled.

Appeals
In 2021, the same judge who sentenced Rodriguez to death, Ralph R. Erickson, now a judge for the United States Court of Appeals for the Eighth Circuit, overturned his sentence and ordered that a new sentencing phase be conducted due to "misleading testimony from a medical examiner and limitations on mental health evidence". The testimony in court of Michael McGee, the Ramsey County Medical Examiner, was “unreliable, misleading and inaccurate” and that Rodriguez's attorneys did him a disservice by opting to limit the mental health evaluation of Rodriguez which could have resulted in the possible use of the insanity defense by their client.

Legacy 
Legislation dubbed "Dru's Law", which set up the Dru Sjodin National Sex Offender Public Registry, was passed in 2006 and signed into law by President George W. Bush.

In 2004, a scholarship in Sjodin's name was set up at the University of North Dakota. 

A memorial garden for Sjodin opened in her hometown of Pequot Lakes, Minnesota, and another is planned for the UND campus.

See also

List of death row inmates in the United States
List of solved missing persons cases
Sex offender registries in the United States

References

External links
Dru's Voice, Facebook page about "Dru's Law" legislation
www.nsopw.gov - Dru Sjodin National Sex Offender Public Website
www.kxmb.com/rodriguez - Full article and video list from KXMB in Bismarck, ND
www.crimelibrary.com - Dru Sjodin murder and trial coverage from Crime Library (Archived)

2003 in North Dakota
2003 murders in the United States
Capital murder cases
Deaths by person in North Dakota
Deaths by stabbing in the United States
Incidents of violence against women
Missing person cases in North Dakota
Sexual assaults in the United States
History of women in North Dakota
November 2003 events in the United States